Helen Sanderson-White (born 1977) is a British singer-songwriter, musician, artist and writer from Buckinghamshire. A singer and pianist, she has worked in most genres including pop, folk, classical and Contemporary Christian Music, however she is most known for her secular pop, soul and jazz work. With a soprano voice, reviewers have said: "she has a really beautiful tone to her voice, rich and silky…", "a great voice, one that captures your attention, these are songs that want to be listened to…" and "Helen's vocals are smooth and pitch-perfect."

Music career 
The daughter of a Baptist minister and a nurse, Sanderson-White's music career began at an early age in church. Her first singing performance was when she three years old and by then time she was five, she was learning to play the piano. She began writing in her teens and to date has released five studio albums. She has collaborated with artists from a variety of genres including Liquidscreamer, Nikki Noodles and more recently with the folk singer Darren Hayman. Sanderson-White spent a large amount of her childhood performing on local circuits in Kent and Devon and honed her craft as a solo performer.

In 1995, she recorded her first demo with Ted Fletcher, which spurred her on to pursue a performing career. At this point she also started teaching singing and piano both privately in and colleges to support her career and has worked with many organisations such as Oxford Youth Choir, Glee Club and Morley College, London. In the mid 1990s she moved to London to study Theology at London Bible College. She returned to music and gained a music degree from Middlesex University where she met fellow collaborator, Rachael Forsyth.

She has been described as a purveyor of beautiful, crafted, thought provoking music and "Fresh, beautiful and profound". Her lyrics are sung with a striking purity and clarity. Described by Liquidscreamer as, "Beautiful, with just enough of a slight dark edge, Helen's songs are not afraid to ask some difficult questions, while delivering memorable vocal and instrumental hooks". Described by Cross Rhythms "Finely-crafted pop songs, driven home by little hooks that get under your skin."

Early work 
Her first album Conversations With The Heart was released in June 2004 on an independent label, Houndsville, and was well received. Recorded on a tiny budget in a friend's dining room, this was to be the marker of the beginning of her solo career. This then led to her second album Fallen But Not Fatal (2006).

In 2007, Sanderson-White was challenged by a priest friend to create a contemporary setting of the Latin Mass which he could use with his young people. Out of this The Sanctus Project (2010) was born and to date this is used around the world.

Resound Media
Between 2010 and 2015, she worked with Resound Media and released two EPs, the first being At Second Glance which was produced by Andy Baker. From this EP, she had a number one hit with "Do You Seek An Answer" which was number one across the UK and Europe in the New Christian Music charts. This was quickly followed by "Surrounded By Love" which reached number four in the Christian Hot disc chart.

In 2011, Sanderson-White won the UK Christian Music Award for "NCM Contemporary Artist (England)" which was presented to her by George Hamilton IV.

Sirens and Other Mysteries  was released in 2013 and is a slow burning collection of intensely personal tracks. Unlike her previous records, this EP was solely based around her acoustic piano and vocal work, and was released in to showcase the sound of her live shows.  The opening track "Without You" showcases a more soul-influenced style than Sanderson-White's previous recordings, featuring some subtle guitar work from Baker that recalls Sade. The EP reached number six in the Louder Than The Music 2013 awards. This EP was supported by a successful Kickstarter campaign to raise funds for a music video for "If That's The Way".

Her final recording with Resound Media was the uptempo single, "Close That Door", which was released in January 2016.

2017 - present
From 2017, Sanderson-White decided to continue working on demos and throughout the year released songs from The Sketchbook: The Demos. This project showcases the songs in demo form so that the listener can experience the raw development of the track. The style is more intimate and performance based.

In 2019 Helen collaborated with The English Jazz Orchestra, and debuted a collection of jazz versions of her songs arranged by Rachael Forsyth.

Collaborations
In 2006, Sanderson-White's vocals featured on the songs "Ali's Song" and "Jealousy" with Cumbria based dance band, Liquidscreamer.

From 2012 to 2015, Sanderson-White worked with British dance music producer Nikki Noodles. Together they co-wrote three singles, "Insane", "I Need A Hallelujah" and "Change The Record".

Her session work led her to work with the folk singer-songwriter, Darren Hayman. In 2014, she provided backing vocals for some of his adaptation of William Morris' Chants for Socialists album and also performed live with Darren at Union Chapel, London, Kelmscott House and the Wimbledon Book Fest. Sanderson-White's voice also features on Hayman's latest project, Thankful Villages 2 which was released in 2017.

In 2022, Helen arranged Ruth Carlyle's poem, "A Homely Blessing" for a charity single in aid of Merton's Faith In Action Homeless Project. The song was performed by Ruth Carlyle with David Barton at the piano.

Art
Sanderson-White began her painting career whilst attending Torquay Grammar School for Girls. She naturally gravitates towards the pointillist style and is most comfortable working with acrylics. Her most well known painting Walking Into The Light has been used by the domestic abuse prevention charities Women's Aid and Restored to highlight that there is always hope in every situation.

Writing
Helen is also known for her writing, in particular her blogs on being artist and also looking at aspects of Christian faith, prophecy and the supernatural lifestyle. Helen and Rachael Forsyth published an ebook The Resilient Artist based on a number of blogs they had written on cultivating and maintaining a creative lifestyle during difficult seasons of life.

Discography

References

External links
 Helen Sanderson-White official website

1977 births
Living people
British women singer-songwriters
Alumni of the London School of Theology
21st-century British singers
British artists